Bath is a populated place in the parish of Saint John, Barbados.

See also
 List of cities, towns and villages in Barbados

References

Saint John, Barbados
Populated places in Barbados